Wide Open is the third studio album by American country music artist Jason Aldean, released on April 7, 2009, by Broken Bow Records.

The album produced four singles; three of which have topped the Billboard country singles chart. "She's Country", the lead-off single, became his second number-one hit on the chart in May 2009, and his first number one since "Why" in May 2006. It was followed by the releases of "Big Green Tractor" and "The Truth", which also topped the chart in September 2009 and February 2010, respectively. "Crazy Town" is the fourth single from the album, which peaked at number 2.

Background
As with his first two albums, Wide Open was produced by Michael Knox.

The first single from Wide Open is "She's Country", which was co-written by former Western Flyer member Danny Myrick. This song reached number one on the U.S. country singles charts in May 2009, becoming Aldean's second number one and his first since "Why" in May 2006. "Big Green Tractor" is the next single, released in May 2009 became Aldean's third number one in August 2009. "This I Gotta See" was previously recorded by Andy Griggs on his 2004 album of the same name. Griggs' version of the song reached number 58 on the country charts in mid-2005. Additionally, Trent Willmon previously recorded "The Truth" on his 2008 album Broken In.

Commercial performance
This album debuted at number 2 on the US Top Country Albums chart, and number 4 on Billboard 200, selling 109,000 copies in the United States in its first week.

The album has sold 1.4 million copies in the United States as of April 2011.  The album was certified double Platinum by the RIAA on January 31, 2017 for two million units consumed.

Track listing

Personnel

Jason Aldean – lead vocals
Kurt Allison – electric guitar
Kristin Barlowe – photography
Rodney Clawson – background vocals
Peter Coleman – engineer, mixing
Jeff Crump – graphic design
Richard Dodd – mastering
Brandon Epps – editing, assistant engineer
Shalacy Griffin – production assistant
Tony Harrell – piano, Hammond B-3 organ, Wurlitzer
Wes Hightower – background vocals
Michael "Mike Dee" Johnson – steel guitar
Tully Kennedy – bass guitar
Michael Knox – producer
Luellyn Latocki – art direction
Liana Manis – background vocals
Billy Panda – acoustic guitar
Rich Redmond – drums, percussion
Mike Rojas – piano, Hammond B-3 organ
Adam Shoenfeld – electric guitar
Neil Thrasher – background vocals

Charts and certifications

Weekly charts

Certifications

Year-end charts

Singles

References

2009 albums
Jason Aldean albums
BBR Music Group albums
Albums produced by Michael Knox (record producer)